Griselinia is a genus of seven species of shrubs and trees, with a highly disjunct distribution native to New Zealand and South America. It is a classic example of the Antarctic flora. It is the sole genus in the family Griseliniaceae. In the past it was often placed in Cornaceae but differs from that in many features.

Description 
Small dioecious trees or shrubs up to 20 m with erect branches, or shrubs up to 2 m with climbing or scandent branches. The leaves are evergreen, thick and leathery, smooth and glossy above, often paler below. The flowers are very small, with five sepals and stamens and a single stigma, borne on terminal or axillary racemes or panicles. Petals 2–3 mm long. However, the female flower of G.lucida has no petals. The fruit is a small red or purple oval berry 5–10 mm long.

Chemical characteristics 
Petroselinic acid occurs as the major fatty acid in the species, indicating a relationship to the Apiaceae and the Araliaceae. Recent genetic evidence from the Angiosperm Phylogeny Group has shown that Griselinia is correctly placed in the Apiales.

New Zealand species
Both trees can be epiphytic or hemiepiphytic. The young tree often colonizes amongst other epiphytes like Collospermum and Astelia high in the forest canopy, before growing aerial roots down the trunk of its host. G. lucida seldom becomes a freestanding tree if having begun life epiphytically, and can often be seen to have collapsed where the host has died.
Epiphytic growth in G. littoralis is less common but does occur in wetter climates.

The vernacular names are of Māori origin.

South American species
The five South American species are smaller shrubs, 1–5 m tall. All are known as Yelmo.
G. carlomunozii – coastal northern Chile (Antofagasta)
G. jodinifolia – Chile
G. racemosa – southern Chile (Los Lagos, Aisén) and adjacent Argentina (western Chubut)
G. ruscifolia – Argentina, Chile, southeast Brazil
G. scandens – central and southern Chile

References

External links
Pictures of Griselinia jodinifolia and Griselinia racemosa from Chilebosque.

Apiales genera
Griseliniaceae
Dioecious plants